The Hague Royals are a Dutch basketball club based in The Hague. Established in 2020, the team played in the highest level of basketball in the Netherlands for two seasons. Home games are played in the Sportcampus Zuiderpark, which has a capacity of 3,500 people.

The Royals are currently on a hiatus after their request for a BNXT League license was denied in 2022.

History

Before the establishment of the Royals, the last time a professional basketball team played at the highest level was C3 Cobra's the 2000–01 season. In May 2020, The Hague Royals announced its plans to play in the Dutch Basketball League (DBL) starting from the 2020–21 season. The name Royals comes from the reputation of The Hague as the Hofstad, where the Dutch royal family is seated.

On 20 June 2020, Bert Samson was announced as the first head coach of the Royals. On 10 August, the Royals signed Sam van Dijk as its first player ever. On 27 August, the DBL granted the club a license for the 2020–21 season. On 3 October, the Royals played their first ever DBL game, losing away against Aris Leeuwarden, 63–81.

In the 2021–22 season, the Royals played in the BNXT League, in which the national leagues of Belgium and the Netherlands have been merged. The Royals ended 21st out of the 21 teams with one victory in the season. The Royals failed to obtain a club licence for the 2022–23 season, the club appealed the decision but without success.

Players

Current roster

Depth chart

Notable players

 Eric Kibi (1 season: 2020–21)

Season by season

Sponsorship

Head coaches

References

External links
Official website

Basketball teams in the Netherlands
Basketball teams established in 2020
Sport in The Hague
Dutch Basketball League teams